Shirin Farhad is a 1956 Indian Hindustani-language romantic drama film directed and produced by Aspi Irani. Based on Khosrow and Shirin from the Shahnameh, it revolves around Princess Shirin (Madhubala) who is forbidden to meet her childhood sweetheart Farhad (Pradeep Kumar) and forced to marry a king.

The film featured a popular soundtrack composed by S. Mohinder and was partially shot in Gevacolor. According to writers Rekha Menon and Mohan Deep, the film was one of the biggest box office successes of Madhubala and Pradeep Kumar's careers.

Plot 
The film is about two star-crossed lovers: Shirin and Farhad. Shirin is a princess who developed a liking for a beautiful deer she saw in a shop in her childhood. As she takes the deer with her at her palace, she promises its owner, Farhad, the poor child of a sculptor to come to her palace everyday and play with her and the deer.

Farhad continues to do so and Shirin and Farhad become very close friends despite social differences; and eventually fall in love. However, a reluctant Shirin's marriage is fixed with the Shahenshah Husro. This first infuriates Farhad and then makes him a wanderer.

The rest of the film deals with how Farhad reaches Shirin's in-law's palace and how her husband Husro promises him to give him "anything" if he is able to create a lake of milk from a rocky mountain for Shirin to bath in. As Farhad succeeds, his enemies tell him that Shirin is dead, and consequently Farhad too kills himself by jumping from a cliff in the milk lake. However, Shirin is alive and upon knowing that Farhad is no more, she jumps into the same lake. The film ends with two lovers climbing the stairs of heaven peacefully, holding each other's hands and finally reuniting.

Cast

Main cast 
 Madhubala as Princess Shirin
 Pradeep Kumar as Farhad
 Ameeta as Shama
 P. Kailash as Shahenshah Husro

Supporting cast 
 Bela Bose as Miriam, Husro's first wife
 Uma Dutt as Farhad's father
 Ram Avtar as Shakroo
 Ashabai as Kalima
 Leela as Young Shirin

Soundtrack 
The soundtrack was composed by S. Mohinder, and lyrics were penned by Tanvir Naqbi and Saba Afghani. "Hazaron Rang Badlega Zamana" and "Guzara Hua Zamana, Aata Nahi Dobara" became popular upon the film's release.

Reception 

As per Times of India, Shirin Farhad was theatrically released on 3 February 1956 in Bombay.

Shirin Farhad proved to be very popular among audience. As per Madhubala's biographer Mohan Deep, the film was a financial success; its success captured the pairing of Madhubala and Pradeep Kumar to fame.

Shirin Farhad was also a breakthrough film of Ameeta. Nett4u reported: "Her acting career took a turn with Shirin Farhad in which she acted along Madhubala in 1956. This hit brought her lead roles in Abhimaan and Zamana."

References

Sources 
 Deep, Mohan. Madhubala: The Mystery and Mystique, Magna Publishing Co. Ltd.

External links 
 

1956 films
Films based on poems
Works based on Shahnameh
Films based on Indian folklore
Indian romantic drama films
1956 romantic drama films
Indian black-and-white films